The Best Bowler ESPY Award has been presented annually since 1995 to the best ten-pin bowler, irrespective of gender, adjudged to be the best in a given calendar year of those contesting the sport professionally in the United States.  To date, the award has only been presented to male bowlers.

Between 1993 and 2004 the award voting panel comprised variously fans; sportswriters and broadcasters, sports executives, and retired sportspersons, termed collectively experts; and ESPN personalities, but balloting thereafter has been exclusively by fans over the Internet from amongst choices selected by the ESPN Select Nominating Committee.

Through the 2001 iteration of the ESPY Awards, ceremonies were conducted in February of each year to honor achievements over the previous calendar year; awards presented thereafter are conferred in June and reflect performance from the June previous. The award wasn't awarded in 2020 due to the COVID-19 pandemic.

List of winners

See also
Professional Bowlers Association
Professional Women's Bowling Association
United States Bowling Congress

Notes

References

ESPY Awards
Ten-pin bowling